Tales of the Typewriter (Hungarian: Mesék az írógépröl) is a 1916 Hungarian silent drama film directed by Alexander Korda and starring Lili Berky, Jenő Janovics and György Kürthy. It was based on a 1905 novel by István Szomaházy.

Cast
Lili Berky as Vilma Lehmann, bank typist 
Jenő Janovics as Bank manager
György Kürthy   
László Betegh   
Mihály Bérczy   
Margit Erdei   
Ilonka Gazda   
Rezsö Harsányi   
Ilona Jakabffy   
József Berky   
Aranka Laczkó   
Vilmos Lengyel   
Gyula Szendrő   
Ilonka Székely   
Ferenc Ujvári

References

External links

Hungarian silent films
Hungarian drama films
Films directed by Alexander Korda
Films based on Hungarian novels
Hungarian black-and-white films
Austro-Hungarian films
1916 drama films
Silent drama films